James Melvin Rhodes (June 14, 1916 – April 29, 1976) was an American educational scientist, assistant professor of education and creativity researcher who was the originator of the pioneering concept of the 4 "P"s of creativity.

Biography
Mel Rhodes was born on June 14, 1916, to Waldo and Grace (Davis) Rhodes in Johnstown, Pennsylvania, as the second eldest of 7 siblings.

He grew up in Middle Taylor, Cambria, Pennsylvania where his father was a farmer. After graduating from high school he went on to study at Juniata College, Huntingdon from 1934 till 1938 and earned a B.A. degree in 1938 (major in sociology). During these schooldays he was president of the Juniata College choir and the Juniata College class of 1938. Having finished his studies his interest of contacting people confirmed him to work as a field representative for Juniata in the years 1938–1941.

One of the first to be drafted for World War II he served in the military from 1941 until 1946 as a major in the China-Burma-India Theater (CBI). After World War II, Rhodes initially worked as director in charge of personnel at the Johnstown Tribune Publishing company 1946–1947. Thereafter he accepted a position as dean of students and director of admissions and placement at Juniata College 1947–1952. He also continued his studies and earned an MS degree in education (major in psychology) at the University of Pennsylvania (Penn State) in 1950.

In 1948 he was married to Rhoda Catherine Metz, whom he met at Juniata College.

In 1950 he became an elected member of the honorary educational fraternity Phi Delta Kappa and later also of the American Psychological Association (APA).

He resigned as dean of Juniata College in 1952 because of health reasons and went on to Arizona State University (ASU) in Tempe (AZ). There he continued his studies and earned his PhD in philosophy (minor in psychology) in 1957; his dissertation was signed on May 16, 1956. During his time at the university he was since 1953 also employed at the student's placement bureau and got promoted in 1956 to director in charge of this institution.

At the completion of his doctorate he accepted a position as assistant professor at the College of Education, University of Arizona in Tucson, Arizona, in 1957. He was on faculty of the department of education from 1957 to 1971 and served for several years additionally as senator-at-large. Also he served in different positions for the Arizona Education Association (AEA).

Rhodes died in Highlands (Florida), (Sebring area) on April 29, 1976, at the age of 60.

Legacy
Together with his wife he sponsored the J. Melvin and Rhoda Metz Rhodes Scholarship, which was first granted in 1976. According to Juniata's Development office the scholarship is still being awarded.

Work
Rhodes is noted for his pioneering work in the early study and research of Creativity and is best known as the architect of the framework of the 4 "P"s of creativity and its implication specifically for the field of applied creativity.

While he was working on his doctoral dissertation "The Dynamics of Creativity: An Interpretation of the Literature on Creativity with a Proposed Procedure for Objective Research"   he was in search for a universal definition of the term creativity. He did not attain this goal but collected more than 40 definitions, and within these various concepts identified four elementary strands of creativity. This idea was later elaborated in a seminal article "An analysis of creativity" which ever since has been credited as the basis for bringing conceptual clarity and structure into creativity, and was regarded as a viable way to look at creativity and to identify momentous approaches for further research in the field.

Research and theory
Rhodes theory asserts that creativity is not merely an elusive and fuzzy capacity with no predictable structure, but exhibits a clear-cut composition of four essential components and dominant factors which have an impact to any kind of result, solution or idea. In his epoch-making article Rhodes wrote 1961: About five years ago I set out to find a definition of the word creativity. I was interested in imagination, originality, and ingenuity. In time I had collected forty definitions of creativity and sixteen of imagination. But as I inspected my collection I observed that the definitions are not mutually exclusive. They overlap and intertwine. When analyzed, as through a prism, the content of the definitions form four strands. Each strand has unique identity academically, but only in unity do the four strands operate functionally.

This article became the probably most cited single source in applied creativity ever and has established Rhodes' reputation as a pioneering contributor to creativity research, since it not only endowed a seemingly unstructured field with a structure, but delivered a classification system and within it four precise starting-points for classified research about creativity.

4 "P"s of creativity
Rhodes defined four separate strands which have influence on the occurrence of creativity and which represent the essential cornerstones for any kind of creativity research: Person, Process, Press and Product:
 "The term person, as used here, covers information about personality, intellect, temperament, physique, traits, habits, attitudes, self-concept, value systems, defense mechanisms, and behaviour." (p. 307).
 "The term process applies to motivation, perception, learning, thinking, and communication." (p. 308).
 "The term press refers to the relationship between human beings and their environment." (p. 308). This notion and the word "press" are rather common in the field of education.
 "The term product refers to a thought which has been communicated to other people in the form of words, paint, clay, metal, stone, fabric, or other material. When an idea becomes embodied into tangible form it is called a product." (p. 309).

Criticism
The concept itself was copied numerous times, sometimes one-to-one, sometimes simply by replacing one term (e.g.: "place" instead of "press"), many a time without crediting the original author. Some followers also tried to add a fifth or sixth term which starts with a "P" (e.g.: "place", "problem", "preference", "phantasy", "persuasion", "passion", "power" or else). On closer inspection it appears that all terms added so far are already included within the original framework, thus are not to be embodied separately in the concept on an equal footing; in details: "Place" is a part of "press", "problem" is as a starting point a vital part of the "process", "preference" and "power" are linked to "persons", and "phantasy", "persuasion", "passion" are traits and capacities of "persons" too.

Hence the original lean concept shall be still deemed to be valid as the essential structure giving map and as "a system that enables researchers to study smaller manageable components of the complex concept of creativity". This does deliver a sound basis both for researcher and practitioner in the field, to align creativity research endeavours in a comprehensive and comprehensible way by pooling the problems and objects of research.

Significance
Today more than 600.000 entries for the keyword "4 "P"s of creativity" listed on Google and countless citations in the literature display tellingly the enduring importance of this concept to the field of creativity. Further testimonials are major international conferences and research projects which have been organized around the 4 "P"s model.

Practical use
Adjacent to his significant findings for further research in the field, Rhodes, as a result of his work, also arrived at the conclusion for the field of education, that "a body of thought about the nature of the creative process belongs in the arsenal of every teacher and teacher-to-be."

Publications
 James Melvin Rhodes: The dynamics of creativity: An interpretation of the literature on creativity with a proposed procedure for objective research. (Unpublished doctoral dissertation). Arizona State University, Tempe 1956
 Mel Rhodes: An analysis of creativity. in Phi Delta Kappan 1961, Vol. 42: 305–311
 James Melvin Rhodes: Creativity resides in mental concept. in The Educational Forum, Volume 27, Issue 4, 1963, 477-481

Further reading
 John Haefele: Creativity and innovation. Reinhold Publishing 1962
 Tudor Rickards: Creativity and the management of change. Blackwell Publishers 1999
 Calvin W. Taylor, Frank Barron: Scientific Creativity: Its recognition and development. John Wiley&Sons 1963

References

External links
 

Creativity researchers
20th-century American educators
American educational theorists
Educational psychologists
Arizona State University faculty
1916 births
1976 deaths